Khaki drill (KD) is the British military term for a type of fabric and the military uniforms made from them.

History
Khaki colour uniforms were first introduced in 1848 in the British Indian Army Corps of Guides. As well as the Corps of Guides, other regiments in India soon adopted the uniform and eventually it was used throughout the British military.

Khaki drill was worn as a combat uniform from 1900 to 1949 and was most often used in desert and tropical service. A variant, still referred to as khaki drill or KD, is worn by the British Armed Forces in non-combatant warm-weather countries where the British are actively serving (e.g. personnel stationed at RAF Akrotiri in Cyprus will wear any of four working variants of this uniform). Generally, KD was a series of different uniform patterns of light khaki cloth, generally cotton, first worn by British and British Empire soldiers in the Boer War. Canada developed its own pattern after the First World War, and the uniform was commonly worn in Canada, with officers again having the option of finer garments privately purchased. In the Second World War, Canadians serving in Jamaica and Hong Kong wore Canadian- pattern KD; the I Canadian Corps troops in Italy wore KD supplied in theatre by the British, generally of British, Indian, or US (War Aid) manufacture.

North Africa and the Mediterranean

In the early part of the North African Campaign and the Mediterranean theatre, British troops wore KD shorts or slacks with long-sleeved Aertex-fabric shirts. The paler tan shade of KD was more suited to desert or semi-desert regions than the "dark khaki" or brown serge used in British Battledress. When the Allies moved up through Italy, however, two-piece khaki denim battledress overalls were increasingly preferred. By 1943, the KD shirt began to be replaced by a more durable cotton KD bush jacket.

Far East

In the Far East, the British found themselves at war with the Japanese while equipped with the impractical KD uniform. Shirts and trousers had to be dyed green as a temporary expedient until more suitable jungle clothing became available. A new tropical uniform in Jungle Green (JG) was quickly developed – a JG Aertex battledress blouse, a JG Aertex bush jacket (as an alternative to the blouse) and battledress trousers in JG cotton drill. In the hot and humid conditions of Southeast Asia, JG darkened with sweat almost immediately.

Post Second World War

The khaki battledress was used until the late 1960s, and various uniform items in KD, JG and olive green (OG) remained on issue to soldiers serving in the Mediterranean, Middle East or tropics after the war. By the end of the 1940s, however, stocks were becoming depleted, and a new 1950-pattern tropical uniform was made available in both KD and JG. It was poorly designed, with an ill-fitting bush jacket in the much-maligned Aertex, and suspender buckles that dug into the hips when marching in full kit. Eventually the much more practical Gurkha regiments’ JG shirt was copied, replacing the 1950-pattern bush jacket. All the same, troops still sought out the older, wartime, issues of the better KD, JG and OG kit.

Notes

References
"Twelve Years of a Soldier's Life in India, from the letters of Major WSR Hodson" by G. Hodson (London) 1859.
DPM: Disruptive Pattern Material by Hardy Blechman and Alex Newman, DPM Ltd. (2004) 

Khaki: Uniforms of the CEF by Clive M. Law (Service Publications, 1998).
Michael Dorosh, Clive M. Law Dressed to Kill: Canadian Army Uniforms in World War Two (Service Publications, Ottawa 2001). 
Hodson-Pressinger, Selwyn "Khaki Uniform 1848-49: First Introduction by Lumsden and Hodson" Journal of the Society for Army Historical Research 82, no. 332 (2004): 341-47. https://www.jstor.org/stable/44231111
 Richard Ingrams,  Martin Brayley (2000) Khaki Drill and Jungle Green: British Army Uniforms in the Mediterranean & Asia 1939-1945  Crowood Press (UK)

External links
 Khaki Drill www.canadiansoldiers.com]
 Canadian forces Military Police Museum site, with many pictures

Military uniforms
British military uniforms